Eremogone bryophylla is a flowering plant in the sandwort (Eremogone) genus. It occurs in the Himalaya of China, Tibet, Nepal, and India.

References

External links

Caryophyllaceae
Flora of East Himalaya